The Church of Saint-Hilaire or Saint-Hilaire-du-Mont is a ruined 12th-century church in Paris, France, active until the French Revolution.

History
An original oratory was built on the site in the 11th century. The site is located on Montagne Sainte-Geneviève on a plot that belonged to the canons of Saint-Marcel.

In 1158, the building was attested as a parish chapel dedicated to Saint Hilary.

During the French Revolution, the church was closed in 1790 and the parish was suppressed in 1793. It was sold as a national good in 1796 and demolished in 1807.

Architecture
A drawing of the church shows that the bell tower was made of carpentry with no masonry.

Ruins
The ruins of the church are located at 2  and 1bis  in the 5th arrondissement of Paris.

The few remains include a column with a capital and a part of an arch. They can be seen in a small courtyard that can be reached from 1bis Rue de Lanneau near the corner of the Rue Vallette.

References

Bibliography

Roman Catholic churches in the 5th arrondissement of Paris
Former Roman Catholic church buildings
Destroyed churches in France
Former buildings and structures in Paris
Buildings and structures demolished in 1807
1793 disestablishments in France